9/1 may refer to:
September 1 (month-day date notation)
January 9 (day-month date notation)

See also
 1/9 (disambiguation)